

The Glödis is one of the most regularly formed summits in the Schober Group in East Tyrol, hence its sobriquet, the "Matterhorn of the Schober Group". It is an impressive sight both from the Debanttal valley and the valley of Kalser Lesachtal.

Name 
Franz Miklosich derives the name from the Slavic word gledna (= "seeing").
According to Heinz Pohl, however, there are 2 possible derivations: either from the early Slovenian glodišće (= "place gnawed away by water", from glodati = "to gnaw"), but this link is phonetically difficult; or more probably from glodež which has a similar meaning.

In the Debanttal valley the mountain was for a long time called the Großer Gößnitzkopf. Its other names include Klöders and Granatkogel.

Routes 
The best ascent option is from the Lienzer Hut along the Franz Keil Way, then on to the Kalser Törl and finally along the southeast arête. In autumn 2006 a klettersteig was installed on the southeast ridge which is of moderate difficulty (grade B). Other well known routes are:
Southwest ridge from the Kalser Törl (II–III, in one place III+), popular, often used
Northeast ridge from Glödistörl (III-), boulder-strewn
West ridge (IV–V), most difficult arête of the Glödis
South ridge (III+), solid rock, rarely used

References

Literature and maps 
 Alpine Club map Sheet 41, 1:25,000, Schobergruppe, 
 Richard Goedeke: 3000er in den Nordalpen, Bruckmann, Munich, 2004, 
 Georg Zlöbl: Die Dreitausender Osttirols. Verlag Grafik Zloebl, Lienz-Tristach, 2005,

External links 

Österreichischer Alpenverein: Glödis Südostgrat. Ein Normalweg wird zum Klettersteig (pdf file; 300 kB)

Alpine three-thousanders
Mountains of the Alps
Mountains of Tyrol (state)
Geography of East Tyrol
Schober Group